The O'Shúilleabháin clan were a bandit group who attempted to set up a sovereign state in Ireland in the early 15th century, led by Seán O'Shúilleabháin.

The most notable of the campaigns by the O'Shúilleabháin clan was the establishment of a settlement called Bellewstown on the Hill of Crockafotha in County Meath. From here they oppressed the local people who eventually rose up under the command of Darren Bellew, and overthrew the O'Shúilleabháin clan.

Irish clans
15th century in Ireland